Silence is the third studio album by Swedish post-hardcore band Blindside. Produced by Howard Benson, it was released on August 20, 2002, through Elektra Records, as the band's major label debut.

Singles
Silence was Blindside's major breakthrough and generated the hit single "Pitiful" as well as the follow-up singles "Sleepwalking" and "Caught a Glimpse."

Track listing

Personnel

Blindside
Christian Lindskog – Lead vocals
Simon Grenehed  – Lead guitar, backing vocals
Tomas Näslund – Bass guitar
Marcus Dahlström – Drums

Artwork
Blindside, David Greenhill, Lili Picou – Art Direction
Johann Perjus – Design
James Minchin III – Photography
DeAnna Klemmer – Groomer
Brandy St. John – Stylist

 
Additional musician
Howard Benson, Jamie Muhoberac – Keyboards

Production
Howard Benson – Producer
Andres Torres – Assistant producer
Josh Deutsch – A&R
Ted Jensen – Mastering
Chris Lord-Alge – Mixing
Eric Miller– Additional mixing on "Silence"
Mike Plotnikoff – Engineer, digital editing
Eric Miller – Additional engineer
Gersh – Drum technician
Steve Russel – Guitar technician, additional engineer
Dan Koshelnyk, Jason Lader, John O – Digital editing

Charts

References

2002 albums
Blindside (band) albums
Albums produced by Howard Benson
Elektra Records albums